The 2017 Chevrolet Silverado 250 was the 15th stock car race of the 2017 NASCAR Camping World Truck Series and the fifth iteration of the event. The race was held on Sunday, September 3, 2017, in Bowmanville, Ontario, at Canadian Tire Motorsport Park, a  permanent road course. The race took the scheduled 64 laps to complete. At race's end, Austin Cindric, driving for Brad Keselowski Racing, would spin out eventual-third-place finisher, GMS Racing driver Kaz Grala on the final lap to win his first and to date, only career NASCAR Camping World Truck Series win and his only win of the season. To fill out the podium, Noah Gragson of Kyle Busch Motorsports would finish second.

Background 

Canadian Tire Motorsport Park is a multi-track motorsport venue located north of Bowmanville, in Ontario, Canada. The name "Mosport" is a portmanteau of Motor Sport, came from the enterprise formed to build the track.

Entry List 

 (R) denotes rookie driver
 (i) denotes driver who is ineligible for series driver points

Practice

First practice 
The first practice session was held on Saturday, September 2, at 9:30 AM EST, and would last for 55 minutes.

Second and final practice 
The second and final practice session, sometimes referred to as Happy Hour, was held on Saturday, September 2, at 11:35 AM EST, and would last for 50 minutes.

Qualifying 
Qualifying was held on Saturday, September 2, at 5:45 PM EST. Since Canadian Tire Motorsport Park is a road course, the qualifying system was a multi-car system that included two rounds. The first round was 25 minutes, where every driver would be able to set a lap within the 25 minutes. Then, the second round would consist of the fastest 12 cars in Round 1, and drivers would have 10 minutes to set a lap. Whoever set the fastest time in Round 2 would win the pole.

No drivers would fail to qualify.

Full qualifying results

Race results 
Stage 1 Laps: 20

Stage 2 Laps: 20

Stage 3 Laps: 24

Standings after the race 

Drivers' Championship standings

Note: Only the first 8 positions are included for the driver standings.

References 

2017 NASCAR Camping World Truck Series
NASCAR races at Canadian Tire Motorsport Park
September 2017 sports events in Canada